This page list topics related to Ascension Island.



0-9

A
Administrator of Ascension Island
Ascension Island
Ascension Island Council
Ascension scrub and grasslands

B
British overseas territories

C
Cat Hill
Communications in Saint Helena, Ascension and Tristan da Cunha
Coat of Arms

D

E
Education

F
 Flag

G
Georgetown
Governor
Green Mountain

H

I

J
João da Nova

K

L
List of mountains and hills of Saint Helena, Ascension and Tristan da Cunha
List of volcanoes in Ascension Island

M

N

O
Outline of Ascension Island

P
Postage Stamps of Ascension Island

Q

R
 RAF Ascension Island

S
Saint Helena
Scouting and Guiding on Saint Helena, Ascension and Tristan da Cunha

T
 Two Boats Village
 Travellers Hill

U

V

W

X

Y

Z

See also
Lists of country-related topics - similar lists for other countries

Ascension Island-related lists
Ascension Island